Edenderry Primary School may refer to:

Edenderry Primary School, Portadown, Portadown, County Armagh, Northern Ireland
Edenderry Primary School, Banbridge, Banbridge, County Down, Northern Ireland